{{Infobox Christian leader
| type = cardinal
| honorific-prefix = His Eminence
| name = Daniel Fernando Sturla Berhouet
| honorific-suffix = S.D.B.
| title = CardinalArchbishop of Montevideo
| image =Daniel Sturla en Misa 0013.jpg
| image_size = 
| alt = 
| caption = 
| native_name = 
| native_name_lang = 
| church = Roman Catholic
| archdiocese = Montevideo
| province = 
| metropolis = 
| diocese = 
| see = Montevideo
| appointed = 11 February 2014
| elected = 
| term = 
| term_start = 9 March 2014
| quashed = 
| term_end = 
| predecessor = Nicolás Cotugno
| successor = 
| opposed = 
| other_post = Cardinal-Priest of Santa Galla (2015-)
| ordination = 21 November 1987
| consecration = 4 March 2012
| consecrated_by = Nicolás CotugnoArturo FajardoMilton Tróccoli
| cardinal = 14 February 2015
| created_cardinal_by = Pope Francis
| rank = Cardinal-Priest
| birth_name = Daniel Fernando Sturla Berhouet
| birth_date = 
| birth_place = Montevideo, Uruguay
| death_date = 
| death_place = 
| buried = 
| nationality = 
| religion = Roman Catholic
| residence = Montevideo
| parents = 
| spouse = 
| children = 
| occupation = 
| previous_post = Auxiliary Bishop of Montevideo (2011–14)Titular Bishop of Phelbes (2011-14)
| profession = 
| alma_mater = 
| signature = 
| coat_of_arms = Escudo de Daniel Sturla.svg
| motto = "Servir al Señor con Alegría"(Serve the Lord with gladness)
| education = 
| signature_alt = 
| coat_of_arms_alt = 
| feast_day = 
| venerated = 
| saint_title = 
| beatified_date = 
| beatified_place = 
| beatified_by = 
| canonized_date = 
| canonized_place = 
| canonized_by = 
| attributes = 
| patronage = 
| shrine = 
| suppressed_date = 
| other = 
| ordinated_by = 
}}

Daniel Fernando Sturla Berhouet, SDB (born 4 July 1959 in Montevideo) is a Uruguayan Roman Catholic prelate and the archbishop of Montevideo.

Biography
Sturla was born in a Uruguayan middle-class family. His parents died when he was a teenager. His eldest brother Martín was an important politician at the end of the 20th century.

He attended John XXIII Institute run by the Salesians of Don Bosco, in Montevideo. He entered the Salesian novitiate in 1979 and made his first religious profession on January 31, 1980. He studied theology at what was then called the Bishop Mariano Soler Theological Institute of Uruguay, and on November 21, 1987, he was ordained a priest.

After his ordination he served as vicar of the Salesian novitiate and postnovitiate, director of the Salesian aspirantate, master of novices, director of the John XXIII Institute, and professor of Church history. He earned a licentiate in theology from the Soler Theological Institute in 2006.

On October 28, 2008, he was named Salesian provincial for Uruguay, and shortly after was elected president of the Conference of Religious of Uruguay.

On December 10, 2011, Pope Benedict XVI named him titular bishop of Felbes and auxiliary bishop of Montevideo. On February 11, 2014, Pope Francis promoted him to archbishop of Montevideo, Uruguay. On 9 March 2014 on the occasion of his inauguration a Mass was held together with Archbishop emeritus Nicolás Cotugno and Apostolic Nuncio Anselmo Guido Pecorari; the Mass was attended by President José Mujica, Vice President Danilo Astori, former President Luis Alberto Lacalle, senator Pedro Bordaberry and the mayor of Montevideo Ana Olivera, among others.

Within the Episcopal Conference of Uruguay he has been put in charge of the Departments of the Missions and of the Laity.

 Cardinal 

Sturla was created a cardinal by Pope Francis on 14 February 2015. As Cardinal-Priest he was assigned the titular church of Santa Galla.

In April 2015 Sturla Berhouet was appointed a member of the Congregation for Institutes of Consecrated Life and Societies of Apostolic Life, Pontifical Council for Promoting the New Evangelization, and Pontifical Commission for Latin America.

On 18 March 2020, Pope Francis named him a member of the Commission of Cardinals of the Administration of the Patrimony of the Apostolic See.

Selected works
 1916–1917: Separación de la Iglesia y el Estado en el Uruguay, Instituto Teológico del Uruguay Mariano Soler, Libro Annual, 1993 
 ¿Santa o de Turismo? Calendario y secularización en el Uruguay'', Instituto Superior Salesiano, colección Proyecto Educativo, 2010

See also
Cardinals created by Pope Francis

References

Additional sources

External links
 
 
 
 

1959 births
Living people
People from Montevideo
Salesians of Don Bosco
Bishops appointed by Pope Benedict XVI
Members of the Pontifical Council for the Promotion of the New Evangelisation
21st-century Roman Catholic archbishops in Uruguay
Uruguayan cardinals
Cardinals created by Pope Francis
Salesian cardinals
Bishops appointed by Pope Francis
Uruguayan Roman Catholic archbishops
Roman Catholic archbishops of Montevideo